The Fundación Yannick y Ben Jakober is located near Alcudia, Mallorca, Spain. Created in 1993, it is a private non-profit cultural institution, dedicated primarily to the preservation and restoration of Spanish Historical Heritage. Additionally it promotes the development of the fine arts in general and painting and sculpture in particular including the exhibition of artworks, the dissemination and knowledge of the matter, the artistic exchange and the implementation of activities aimed to facilitate the access to information of those who are interested. Its main territorial scope is the Balearic Islands.
The headquarters of the foundation is the Sa Bassa Blanca Museum, whose main building was designed by the famous Egyptian architect Hassan Fathy (1900-1989) in 1978. This building was declared a Listed Building (Landmark) by the Heritage Commission of the Government of Mallorca in 2011. The foundation is known for its collection of Old Master Portraits of Children from the 16th century to the 19th century, also listed as Historical Heritage, which is shown to the public in an old water reservoir conditioned for this purpose.

History of the foundation
The couple formed by Yannick Vu and Ben Jakober created the foundation in 1993, and counted from the beginning with the support of their friend, the banker and philanthropist Georges Coulon Karlweis(died 2012).
Yannick Vu, president of the foundation, a painter and sculptor, born in France (1942) is now British. With a Vietnamese father and a French mother she grew up in Vence and Saint-Paul-de-Vence in a family linked to the arts and music. Her father, Vu Cao Dam (1908-2000) was a renowned Vietnamese painter and sculptor. Yannick Vu met the painter Domenico Gnoli (1933-1970) in 1963 in Paris and that same year they traveled together to Mallorca, they married in 1965 in New York City. Gnoli died at the age of 36, having achieved international success. In 1972, Yannick Vu remarried the sculptor Ben Jakober secretary of the Fundación. Beginning in 1979 Yannick Vu regularly exhibited her paintings in Europe and the U.S. and in the eighties she started making sculpture.
Ben Jakober is the secretary of the Fundación. Born in Vienna in 1930, he has had ties to Mallorca since 1968. Self-taught, he began his career as a sculptor at forty, encouraged by Yannick Vu. He uses different techniques and materials such as polyurethane, metal, stone, marble, installation, video and fiber optics and has had international exhibitions in Paris, New York, Budapest, Madrid and Palma de Mallorca. He has participated in numerous biennials.
Since 1992, Ben Jakober and Yannick Vu sign their work together, as if they were a single artist. Their works form part of various public and private collections around the world. You can find works signed by them in different parts of Mallorca, such as Alcudia, Pollensa, the university campus, the airport or in front of Palma's Cathedral.
The foundation's board includes: Vice President Anthonie Stal (chairman of the board of the Kröller-Muller Museum in Otterlo, the Netherlands); Sofia Carmen Barroso Fernandez Araoz (expert in art and museum relations) and Cristina López Mancisidor de Macaya (former president of the Red Cross in Spain, Sebastian Escarrer Jaume (Counsellor of Melia Hotels International)  and Enrique Juncosa Cirer (Poet and curator).
Sa Bassa Blanca's main building, home to the foundation, has gone through different stages throughout its history. Originally, it was a typical Majorcan farm house, dedicated to agriculture and native livestock. During the Spanish Civil War and until the 70's, the edifice was a military base due to its strategic location on the Bay of Alcudia. In 1978 the property was acquired by a consortium of which Ben Jakober and Yannick Vu formed part. They commissioned the Egyptian architect Hassan Fathy (1900-1989) to draw up the plans, which made Sa Bassa Blanca the only building designed by him in Europe. The rooms of the new building, thought of as a "ribat", were organized around a central courtyard. The Hispano Moresque character of the building is well suited to the island of Mallorca, having seen many different civilizations over the years. In April 2011 the Hassan Fathy building was declared a Listed Building (Landmark) by the Heritage Commission of the Government of Mallorca.

Contents of the foundation

The “Nins” Collection

After the initial contribution by the founders and with the help of other benefactors, the foundation has assembled an important collection of works of art. The main collection is “Nins”, which began over 40 years ago with a painting by the Majorcan painter Joan Mestre i Bosch (1826-1893) "Portrait of a girl with cherries" and now consists of more than 150 Old Master portraits of children from the 16th to the 19th centuries from different European countries. Most of the works represent portraits of royalty or nobility in their childhood, although there are some bourgeois and provincial paintings. Part of this collection is on view in an old underground water reservoir that was transformed into an exhibition hall and equipped to house and preserve the paintings. The collection shows the evolution of costumes, jewelry, amulets, pets, and toys that were part of the everyday life of the young models. Some of the works were commissioned to be sent to European courts in view of a marriage, as part of a complex net of political alliances and families, designed to ensure the survival of the main royal and noble dynasties of Europe.

The foundation also has a program of travelling temporary international exhibitions. Selected works have been exhibited in prominent museums like the Museu d'Arte Brasileira, Fundação Armando Alvares Penteado in São Paulo in 2000; the Museu de Belles Arts de València in 2000; the Kunst- und Ausstellungshalle der Bundesrepublik Deutschland in Bonn in the winter of 2003/2004; the Museum of Fine Arts of Corunna in 2004; the Frist Center for the Visual Arts in Nashville in the winter of 2004/2005; the State Historical Museum in Moscow in the winter of 2005/2006; the Columbus Museum of Art, the Huntsville Museum of Art, The Society of the Four Arts,Palm Beach, Florida and the Nassau County Museum of Art, Roslyn Harbor, New York in 2008/2009 and the KunsthalleKrems, Austria in 2011. In October 2012 fifty six pictures are being shown in the Pera Museum, Istanbul and in 2013 thirty five are going to the Casa del Cordón (Burgos) in Burgos, Spain.
Texts have been written by prominent Spanish, French, Italian and Dutch arthistorians, many of which are included in international publications.

SoKraTESspace

The main subject of the technical underground hall called SoKraTES revolves around the installation inspired by Albert Einstein's formula which defines the relationship between space and time. The spectacular curtain of Swarovski crystals made with 10.000 crystals acts as a dramatic backdrop toa complete fossilized skeleton of a Siberian woolly rhinoceros (Coelodonta antiquitatis), dated to the Riss-Wurm interglacial period of the Late Pleistocene. There are also works by Dolores Vita, José María Sicilia, Jannis Kounellis, Gerhard Merz and Miquel Barceló (Felanitx, 1957), author of the new chapel in Palma cathedral; some works by Ben Jakober and Yannick Vu and tribal masks from Nepal, Tibet, Africa and the Himalayas.

Library
The foundation's library houses more than 7,000 specialized books on art, photography and architecture, catalogued using the MilleniumInnopac program, supplied by the University of the Balearic Islands and shared by the Network of Libraries of the Balearic Islands, which allows students of the Universitat de les Illes Balears (UIB) to view the list of catalogued books via the Internet. Students or teachers can visit the library in person to consult the books by appointment. The library includes several works of contemporary art, such as the library wheel "Leer con Prisa” by Ben Jakober and Yannick Vu, six lithographs by Miquel Barceló and two portraits of the founders painted by their friend Mati Klarwein (1932-2002).

Sculpture park
The foundation has a park with "zoological" sculptures. Located in the gardens that surround the museum, the sculptures by Ben Jakober and Yannick Vu are animal forms inspired by archaeological works currently preserved in museums around the world. The monumental sculptures are executed in granite. The largest work is "Dog", based on a terracotta of the Japanese Haniwa culture (4th and 5th centuries AD), in the Tokyo National Museum.

Rose garden

Designed by Yannick Vu, the rose garden has over a hundred varieties of fragrant old English roses. It is designed as a walled "HortusConclusus" or medieval garden and is combined with an experimental organic kitchen garden.

Educational activities
The foundation receives visits from people of many nationalities, attracted by its strategic location and its important collections. At present, its most important activity is the development of the educational program, focused on schools on the island of Mallorca, university interns and families with children.
Students of all ages have the opportunity to come and commence their knowledge of art through specialized visits. During the school year 2013/14 there were 3549 school visitors, while this year 2014/2015 we received 4470 students. The challenge, from the beginning, has been to provide different views on how to foment a first contact with art and encourage the curiosity of the youngest, in a playful yet didactic way. Educational visits to the Sa Bassa Blanca Museum are developed under the title "Discovering the history of art and its hidden secrets." This activity takes place in the different exhibition halls and endeavors to open a window on art in the hope that this first experience becomes a positive drive for future interactions with art.
Based on the historical context and the importance of symbolism in the exhibitions, this visit aims to transmit values of respect and admiration for the artistic legacy. It is intended that students learn to enjoy art, its mechanisms (approaching artistic techniques) and their different languages, as well as understand the notion of timelessness in human expression through art and history.

Heritage organizations
Culture of Mallorca
History organisations based in Spain